Esperanzas is the second album by Mexican iconic pop singer Yuri. It was released on June 28, 1980, on Discos Gamma as well as Profono Internacional.

Track listing

Singles
 Esperanzas/Bailad (The Clapping Song)
 Primer Amor
 Regresarás
 Goma de mascar

Promotion
The album was released in the following countries for sale and radio airplay:
 Mexico
 Venezuela
 United States
 Colombia
 Chile
 Peru
 Guatemala
 Ecuador
 Dominican Republic

Sales
 Gold - Mexico 150,000 copies
 Gold - Venezuela 150,000 copies (first gold album outside Mexico)

1980 albums
Yuri (Mexican singer) albums